Dom Teodósio I of Braganza (1510 – 22 September 1563) was the 5th Duke of Braganza, among other titles. He is known for ceding the title of Duke of Guimarães to Infante Duarte of Aviz, alongside some of the wealth and properties of the House of Braganza.

Biography 
The Duke Teodósio I was an educated and refined man, a typical Renaissance prince. He loved painting and sculpture.

Marriage and Issue 
In 1542, he married his 1st cousin Isabel of Lencastre (1513–1558), daughter of his uncle Dinis, and had John (João) I of Braganza, who succeeded him as 6th Duke of Braganza.

In 1559, he remarried with Beatriz of Lencastre (1542–1623), granddaughter of Infante George of Lencastre, Duke of Coimbra. Their first child, Jaime of Braganza, died without issue in 1578, in the Battle of Alcacer Quibir. Their second child, Isabel, married the 1st Duke of Caminha.

Ancestry

Bibliography
"Nobreza de Portugal e Brasil" Vol. II, page 445. Published by Zairol Lda., Lisbon, 1989.
 Genealogy of Duke Teodósio I of Braganza (in Portuguese)
VILA-SANTA, Nuno, "O Duque como conselheiro: D. Teodósio e a Coroa em meados de Quinhentos"

External links

|-

House of Braganza
Dukes of Braganza
103
1510 births
1563 deaths
16th-century Portuguese people

Portuguese nobility